Iuhetibu Fendy (also written Jewhetibew Fendy) was an ancient Egyptian princess of the Thirteenth Dynasty. She was the daughter of king Sobekhotep III and of queen Neni. Iuhetibu Fendy is known from two sources. She appears on a rock-cut stela in the Wadi el-Hol and she appears on a stela from Abydos now in the Louvre in Paris (C8). On the stela she is shown together with her sister Dedetanqet (also written Dedetanuq) in front of the fertility god Min. Her two names are written within a cartouche (a ring that enclosures the name), a privilege that was given in this time very rarely to royal women and points to a special status of Iuhetibu Fendy. Iuhetibu Fendy bears a double name. The first name Iuhetibu was also the name of Iuhetibu Fendy's grandmother. Naming children after grandparents was not uncommon in Ancient Egypt. Fendy is a nickname meaning "nose".

References 

18th-century BC women
Princesses of the Thirteenth Dynasty of Egypt